Peter Leitham Gardiner (22 July 1896 – 15 June 1975) was a Scottish first-class cricketer and footballer.

Gardiner was born in July 1896 at Perth. A club cricketer for Perthshire, he made two appearances in first-class cricket for Scotland against Ireland six years apart from one another; his first match coming in 1925, with his second match coming in 1931. Both matches were played at College Park, Dublin. He scored 67 runs in these matches, with a highest score of 42. With his right-arm medium pace bowling, he took 3 wickets at an average of 45.33, with best figures of 2 for 7. Outside of cricket, Gardiner played association football for Falkirk F.C. and St Johnstone F.C. as a goalkeeper. Gardiner died at Perth in June 1975.

References

External links
 

1894 births
1975 deaths
Cricketers from Perth, Scotland
Footballers from Perth, Scotland
Scottish footballers
Association football goalkeepers
Falkirk F.C. players
St Johnstone F.C. players
Scottish cricketers